The 1902 Wisconsin gubernatorial election was held on November 4, 1902.

Incumbent Republican Governor Robert M. La Follette defeated Democratic nominee David Stuart Rose with 52.89% of the vote.

General election

Candidates
Major party candidates
David Stuart Rose, Democratic, incumbent Mayor of Milwaukee
Robert M. La Follette, Republican, incumbent Governor

Other candidates
Emil Seidel, Socialist (Social-Democratic Party of Wisconsin)
Edwin W. Drake, Prohibition, candidate for Wisconsin State Senate in 1886
Henry E. D. Puck, Socialist Labor, architect

Results

References

Bibliography
 
 
 

1902
Wisconsin
Gubernatorial